Alterococcus is a genus of bacteria from the family of Opitutaceae with one species Alterococcus agarolyticus.

References

Verrucomicrobiota
Bacteria genera
Monotypic bacteria genera
Taxa described in 1999